Komga is a town in Amatole District Municipality in the Eastern Cape province of South Africa.

It was founded as a farming centre in 1877 on the site of a military camp established in 1854, and acquired municipal status in 1904. Of Khoekhoen origin, the name probably does not mean 'brown', as has been stated, but 'lots of clay', 'clayey'.

It is also home to one of the oldest schools in the Eastern Cape, Komga Junior, as well as St. Paul's Anglican Church which is a national heritage site.

Service protest
In 2006, an angry group of residents allegedly torched the house of the mayor of Komga. Mandisa Kema's house was completely destroyed. Residents were complaining about poor services and their demands included the removal of Kema from office. Residents were extremely "dissatisfied" but later went home, it appeared the residents regrouped later that night and went to Kema's house. One person believed to be involved in the incident was arrested and questioned.

Demographics

Komga is a diverse town that includes a neighbouring township, the residents of which speak many languages.  The most commonly spoken language is Xhosa, followed by Afrikaans and English.

References

Populated places in the Great Kei Local Municipality